Imarisha Cooperative Savings & Credit Society Limited, also known as Imarisha Sacco Limited, but often referred to as Imarisha Sacco, is a savings and credit co-operative society (Sacco) in Kenya, the largest economy in the East African Community. 

Imarisha Sacco is a small financial services provider in Kenya. , it was the ninth-largest Cooperative Savings and Credit Society in Kenya, with total assets of approximately US$60 million (KSh5.2 billion). At that time, its membership numbered in excess of 35,000, with shareholders' equity of about US$37 million (KSh3.2 billion).

History
The society was established in 1978, under the name: Kipsigis Teachers Sacco, with the support of two teachers' unions, namely (a) Kenya National Union of Teachers (KNUT) and (b) Kenya Union of Post Primary Education Teachers (KUPPET). With an initial membership of 100 teachers, the objective was to meet the financial needs of teachers, using funds mobilized from the members. In 2014, the society re-branded to its current name and began to accept members outside the teaching profession.

Ownership
The shares of stock of Imarisha Sacco Limited are privately owned. The detailed shareholding in the Cooperative society in not widely, publicly known.

Branches
, the society maintains a network of branches at the following locations:
 Kericho Head Office - Imarisha Teachers Sacco Building, Nakuru-Kericho Highway, Kericho
 Bomet Branch - Imarisha Teachers Sacco Building, Bomet
 Bureti Branch - Kabianga University Building, Sotik-Kericho Highway, Bureti
 Branch Number Four
 Branch Number Five
 Kapsabet Branch - Kapsabet (In development)
 Kisumu Branch - Kisumu (In development)
 Kilgoris Branch - Kilgoris (In development)

See also
 Mwalimu National Sacco
 Unaitas Sacco
 Kenya Banks
 Kenya Economy

References

External links
 Kenya Eases Pain of Loan Defaulters, Alters Credit Bureau Rules

Financial services companies of Kenya
Banks established in 1978
Kenyan companies established in 1978
Financial services companies established in 1978